Dumani Siphosethu Mtya (born 14 March 1985) is a South African born Romanian rugby union player. He plays as a lock for professional SuperLiga club Știința Baia Mare.

Club career
Before joining Știința Baia Mare, Dumani Mtya played rugby for University of Cape Town and Walmers RFC, both in South Africa, for Bruff in Ireland and Romangna in Italy. In Romania he played for Farul Constanța and CSM București.

International career
Mtya is also selected for Romania's national team, the Oaks, making his international debut during Week 5 of 2018 Rugby Europe Championship against the Lelos on 18 March 2018.

References

External links
 
 
 

1985 births
Living people
CSM București (rugby union) players
CSM Știința Baia Mare players
RCJ Farul Constanța players
Romania international rugby union players
Romanian rugby union players
Rugby union locks
Rugby union players from East London, Eastern Cape
South African rugby union players
Western Province (rugby union) players